The Normandy Veterans' Association (NVA) was an association formed in 1981 of ex-servicemen and women who served in the 1944 Normandy invasion.

The association was represented at the 70th anniversary of D-Day in Normandy in June 2014. Due to dwindling numbers the association decided to disband in November 2014. The last official engagement of the association took place at St Margaret's, Westminster (Westminster Abbey) on 16 October 2014.

The National Standard of the NVA was 'laid up' at Westminster Abbey with a plaque that reads:

See also
 1940 Dunkirk Veterans' Association

References

External links
 D-day anniversary: Britain's Normandy veterans gather for last time - the Guardian, 6 June 2014 

Military personnel of World War II
British veterans' organisations
1981 establishments in the United Kingdom